Friedrich Baur ( or Fridrichs Baurs, 1879–1950) was a Latvian painter and graphic artist of Baltic German descent. His work was part of the art competitions at the 1928 Summer Olympics and the 1932 Summer Olympics.

Baurs was born in Latvia on 16 June 1879 while it was under the rule of the Russian Empire. During World War II, he left for Germany, where he died in 1950.

References

1879 births
1950 deaths
20th-century Latvian painters
Latvian painters
Olympic competitors in art competitions
Place of birth missing
Latvian emigrants to Germany